Varsham may refer to:

 Varsham (2004 film), Telugu romantic action film
 Varsham (2014 film), Malayalam drama film